Mararo is a village settlement located in Kenya's former Central Province.  The village is located in Githunguchu sub-Location,  N'genda Location, Gatundu District, Gatundu South Constituency,  Kiambu County.  The village lies about 5 kilometres to the east of Gatundu Township.

 The name mararo,  meaning a sleep over place,  was derived from  workers who used to come to work in a coffee farm established by one,  Kiruthu Kimiti.  Mr Kimiti used to be a senior employee in a white settler's  farm about 10 kilometres further east towards Juja town. Whenever he brought workers from the settlers farm to work on his farm,  they would not go back same day but stay over for sometime as he had put up a labour camp.  That's how they named the village "the place of sleepover".

The main economic activity in Mararo village is subsistence, dairy,  coffee and macadamia farming.  In some cases farmers grow bananas and avocado fruits for both subsistence and commercial sale.  Like in most rural villages in Kenya,  youth unemployment and alcoholism are  challenges  experienced in the village.

Mararo village has produced some galant sons and daughters including: the late Virginia Wanjiru Kiguta,  a retired nurse and one of the earliest females to study up-to form four. Fr Mungai Wainaina,  a Catholic Priest, among others.  The most prominent son of the village is Mr Peter Nginga Kiguta,  MBS,  the first person from the village to achieve  Bachelor's and Master's degrees.

Mr Kiguta rose to become a prominent civil servant rising to the position of Chief Economist in the Ministry of Finance,  Kenya.  Thereafter,  he  worked internationally as a very senior economist rising to the position of Director General at the East African Community Secretariat,  Arusha,  Tanzania.

He is currently a Senior Economic  Advisor in the government of Kenya and also Chairman of the Board of Directors for Kenya National Bureau of Statistics. The bureau is responsible for production of official statistics. Mr Kiguta in 2019 oversaw successful  carrying out of the Kenya Household and Population Census. This was the most credible census since the one of 1969. The census report was released in a record period of one and a half months,  a world record.

References 

Populated places in Central Province (Kenya)